ZDCM-04 is a recreational designer drug with psychedelic effects. It is a phenethylamine derivative which is claimed to act as a prodrug for DOC and theophylline in the same way in which fenethylline acts as a prodrug for amphetamine and theophylline. ZDCM-04 was made illegal in Italy in March 2020.

See also 
 25C-NBOMe
 Lisdexamphetamine

References 

Chloroarenes
Designer drugs